Niwar, also known as Pahadi, is a town on the banks of the Niwar River in Katni District in Madhya Pradesh, India. It is the administrative headquarters of Katni District. It is located in the Mahakoshal Region of Central India.

References

Cities and towns in Katni district